The 2009 Ondrej Nepela Memorial was the 17th edition of an annual senior-level international figure skating competition held in Slovakia. The competition was held between November 5 and 7, 2009 at the Ice Sport Rink in Piešťany. Skaters competed in the disciplines of men's singles, ladies' singles, pair skating, and ice dancing. The compulsory dance was the Tango Romantica.

Results

Men

Ladies

Pairs

Ice dancing

External links
 
 17th Ondrej Nepela Memorial results
 Ondrej Nepela Memorial at the Slovak Figure Skating Association

Ondrej Nepela Memorial
Ondrej Nepela Memorial, 2009